EXP-561 is an investigational drug that acts as an inhibitor of the reuptake of serotonin, dopamine, and norepinephrine. It was developed in the 1960s by Du Pont and was suggested as a potential antidepressant but failed in trials and was never marketed.

References

Amines
Antidepressants
Serotonin–norepinephrine–dopamine reuptake inhibitors
Stimulants
Experimental drugs